Conklin Hill is a mountain located in the Catskill Mountains of New York east-northeast of Downsville. Bryden Hill is located north, and Renard Hill is located southwest of Conklin Hill.

References

Mountains of Delaware County, New York
Mountains of New York (state)